New Taipei Municipal Lin-kou Senior High School (LKSH), previously National Linkou High School, is a high school in Linkou District, New Taipei, Taiwan.

History
On April 24, 1995, the preliminary offices of the school (then planned as the Linkou High School) were established under the permission of Taiwan Education Department. On August 1, 1998, Chang Pao-kuang, the director of the Bureau of Education, was assigned to be the director of the Linkou High School's preliminary office, beginning the school's blueprinting. On February 1, 2000, the planned school was nationalised and thus renamed as the National Linkou High School.

On August 1, 2000 the school opened with 10 classes during its first year, with plans to expand 45 classes. Chang Pao-kuang became the school's first principal. On January 1, 2013 the school's governance was handed to the New Taipei municipality, leading to its present name, the New Taipei Municipal Linkou Senior High School.

As of 2013 the school has a total of 45 classes, with 15 per grade.

Student life

Natural Science Contest 
The school offers a focus on the education of the sciences and mathematics and has held a nationwide event called, “the International Year of Chemistry”, in association with the Chemistry Course Center in Taiwan.

Observatory 
The school's science building is equipped with an observatory, featuring astronomical telescopes with auto-tracking and control functions.

See also
 Education in Taiwan

References

External links

 Lin-kou High School 

2000 establishments in Taiwan
Educational institutions established in 2000
High schools in Taiwan
Schools in New Taipei